Mahmudeh (also Romanized as Maḩmūdeh; also known as Maḩmūdābād, Moḩammadābād, and Muhammadābād) is a village in Kowleh Rural District, Saral District, Divandarreh County, Kurdistan Province, Iran. At the 2006 census, its population was 141, in 31 families. The village is populated by Kurds.

References 

Towns and villages in Divandarreh County
Kurdish settlements in Kurdistan Province